James McCaffrey (born 1959) is an American actor best known for his voice role as Max Payne in the Max Payne video game series, Jimmy Keefe on Rescue Me (2004–2011), and Captain Arthur O'Breun in New York Undercover (1994–1997). He has also had main roles and recurring roles in a number of television series as well as appearing in feature films.

Career
McCaffrey's first role was as a mentally challenged teen in [[Bill Sackter|Bill II: on His Own: The Bill Sackter Story]]. He played the lead in the first and last seasons of the series Viper, and the short-lived series Swift Justice, and has appeared on As the World Turns and Sex and the City. Additionally, McCaffrey is known for playing deceased New York City firefighter Jimmy Keefe on Rescue Me, as well as Ryan Huntley on Revenge.

McCaffrey is known as the voice of Thomas Zane in the video game Alan Wake and the title character in the video games Max Payne, Max Payne 2: The Fall of Max Payne, and Max Payne 3; he appeared in a cameo role in the film adaptation of the video game, playing an FBI agent brought in to assist in the capture of Payne. He also starred as Father Thomas in the mystery thriller film A Cry from Within''.

Personal life
McCaffrey owns a home in Larchmont, New York.

Filmography

Films

Television series

Video games

References

External links
 

Actors from Albany, New York
American male film actors
American male soap opera actors
American male television actors
American male video game actors
American male voice actors
Living people
20th-century American male actors
21st-century American male actors
1959 births
Male actors from New York (state)